Bolo Township (་) is a township in Jomda County, Chamdo, Tibet Autonomous Region, China.

Administrative divisions 
Bolo Township is divided into eight administrative villages.

 Guse Village
 Chongsang Village
 Waichong Village
 Adang Village
 Reduo Village
 Epeng Village
 Ningba Village
 Bogong Village

Culture 
Tibetan woodblock printing reportedly has its origins in a village in Bolo Township. The village has 60 woodblock artists who practice woodblock printing for more than eight months per year. The village's artists state that the art has been practiced in their village for over 300 years.

References 

History of printing
Populated places in Chamdo
Township-level divisions of Tibet